Lochani Bag is an Indian actor who works mainly in the Odia film industry, "Ollywood". She has acted in films such as Aadim Vichar, Pahada ra Luha, Sala Budha and Odisha's first biopic film Tulasi Apa.

Career
Lochani got the opportunity to work with award-winning film maker Sabyasachi Mohapatra in Aadim Vichar, which was her first film. The film won national award and state awards including her first award as best supporting actress. Lochani has acted in Pahadara Luha directed by Sabyasachi Mohapatra and Tulasi Apa directed by Amiya Pattnaik in 2015. Both films were screened at the International Film Festival of India (IFFI) in the Indian Panorama section. Tulasi Apa was also screened at the 21st Kolkata International Film Festival, the 8th Bengaluru International Film Festival, the International Film Festival of Shimla (IFFS, the 8th Nasik International Film Festival in India and at the Tehran Jasmine International Film Festival in Ramsar, Iran. Tulasi Apa received positive reviews from the critics when it was screened at the 21st Kolkata International Film Festival and the 8th Bengaluru International Film Festival. Both of her films were highly successful as Pahada Ra Luha got a national award and Tulasi Apa won various state awards.

Filmography

Awards

References

External links

Actresses in Odia cinema
Indian actors
Year of birth missing (living people)